Donaldson Creek is a  long 2nd order tributary to Mayo Creek in Person County, North Carolina.

Course
Donaldson Creek rises in a pond about 2 miles southeast of Triple Springs, North Carolina, and then flows northwest to join Mayo Creek about 2 miles southwest of Triple Springs.

Watershed
Donaldson Creek drains  of area, receives about 46.4 in/year of precipitation, has a wetness index of 402.03, and is about 63% forested.

References

Rivers of North Carolina
Rivers of Person County, North Carolina
Tributaries of the Roanoke River